Calliomphalus is an extinct genus of sea snails in the family Eucyclidae.

See also 
 List of marine gastropod genera in the fossil record

References

External links 

 
 

Prehistoric gastropod genera
Eucyclidae